The euglyphids are a prominent group of filose amoebae that produce shells or tests from siliceous scales, plates, and sometimes spines.  These elements are created within the cell and then assembled on its surface in a more or less regular arrangement, giving the test a textured appearance.  There is a single opening for the long slender pseudopods, which capture food and pull the cell across the substrate.

Euglyphids are common in soils, marshes, and other organic-rich environments, feeding on tiny organisms such as bacteria.  The test is generally 30–100 μm in length, although the cell only occupies part of this space.  During reproduction a second shell is formed opposite the opening, so both daughter cells remain protected.  Different genera and species are distinguished primarily by the form of the test.  Euglypha and Trinema are the most common.

The euglyphids are traditionally grouped with other amoebae.  However, genetic studies instead place them with various amoeboid and flagellate groups, forming an assemblage called the Cercozoa.  Their closest relatives are the thaumatomonads, flagellates that form similar siliceous tests.

Phylogeny
Phylogeny based on Chatelain et al. 2013

Taxonomy
Order Euglyphida Copeland 1956 emend. Cavalier-Smith 1997
 Genus Tracheleuglypha Deflandre 1928
 Genus Ampullataria van Oye 1956
 Genus Euglyphidion Bonnet 1960
 Genus Heteroglypha Thomas & Gauthier-Lièvre 1959
 Genus Matsakision Bonnet 1967
 Genus Pareuglypha Penard 1902
 Family Paulinellidae de Saedeleer 1934 emend. Adl et al. 2012
 Genus Micropyxidiella Tarnawski & Lara 2015
 Genus Ovulinata Anderson, Rogerson & Hannah 1997 [Ovulina Anderson, Rogerson & Hannah 1996 non Ehrenberg 1845]
 Genus Paulinella Lauterborn 1895
 Family Cyphoderiidae de Saedeleer 1934
 Genus Campascus Leidy 1877
 Genus Corythionella Golemansky 1970
 Genus Cyphoderia Schlumberger 1845
 Genus Messemvriella Golemansky 1973
 Genus Pseudocorythion Valkanov 1970
 Genus Schaudinnula Awerintzew 1907
 Suborder Euglyphina Bovee 1985 emend. Kosakyan et al. 2016
 Family Assulinidae Lara et al. 2007
 Genus Assulina Ehrenberg 1872
 Genus Placocista Leidy 1879
 Genus Valkanovia Tappan 1966 [Euglyphella Valkanov 1962 non Warthin 1934]
 Family Euglyphidae Wallich 1864 emend Lara et al. 2007
 Genus Euglypha Dujardin 1841
 Genus Scutiglypha Foissner & Schiller 2001
 Family Sphenoderiidae Chatelain et al. 2013
 Genus Deharvengia Bonnet 1979
 Genus Sphenoderia Schlumberger 1845
 Genus Trachelocorythion Bonnet 1979
 Family Trinematidae Hoogenraad & De Groot 1940 emend Adl et al. 2012
 Genus Corythion Taránek 1882
 Genus Neopileolus Ozdikmen 2009 [Pileolus Coûteaux & Chardez 1981]
 Genus Playfairina Thomas 1961
 Genus Puytoracia Bonnet, 1970 non Raabe 1972
 Genus Trinema Dujardin 1841

References

Imbricatea
Cercozoa orders
Amoeboids